Lake Eacham is a rural locality in the Tablelands Region, Queensland, Australia.

History 
The locality presumably takes its name from the waterbody Lake Eacham in the north-west of the locality. The name of the lake is believed to be an Aboriginal word ''yeetcham'' meaning ''big spring''.

Lake Eacham State School opened on 1911. In 1919 it was renamed Peeramon State School. It closed on 1959.

Education 
There are no schools in Lake Eacham. The nearest primary schools are in Yungaburra, Malanda, and Butchers Creek. The nearest secondary school is in Malanda.

References 

Tablelands Region
Localities in Queensland